The Olympian was an automobile built in Pontiac, Michigan, USA, by the Olympian Motors Company from 1917 to 1921.

History 
R. A. Palmer purchased the well equipped Cartercar factory from General Motors to produce a low priced car. Model 37 was a 4-cylinder 23-hp touring car called the Tourist selling for $795 and a four-seat roadster called the Gypsy selling for $825.  The car was given a large selection of colors to distinguish them from competitors.

In 1920, management issues caused the company to be sold to Otis Friend and the Friend automobile would go into production later in 1920.

References

Defunct motor vehicle manufacturers of the United States
Motor vehicle manufacturers based in Michigan
Defunct manufacturing companies based in Michigan
Vintage vehicles
1910s cars
1920s cars
Vehicle manufacturing companies established in 1917
Vehicle manufacturing companies disestablished in 1920
Cars introduced in 1920